Funbrain is an educational browser game website for children and adults. It was on this site that Diary of a Wimpy Kid was first published before being turned into a successful book series and movie franchise.

History
The website was founded in May 1992 and is owned by Poptropica Worldwide; a division of Family Education Network. The current publisher is Jess Brallier. The company said the site has 65,000 teachers registered, 35 million visits per month, and 60,000 page visits per day, and provides mathematics and kid style games.

Features
Diary of a Wimpy Kid. A popular feature of FunBrain.com is the continuous story Diary of a Wimpy Kid, which was published as a novel in April 2007. In August 2021, Diary of a Wimpy Kid was shut down, meaning it is no longer available to read.
 Math Arcade The Math Arcade, a collection of 25 math related games such as Ball Hogs, Mummy Hunt, and Bumble Numbers, is a game with fairly simple basic math, with difficulty varying depending on the age of the player. This arcade is completely finished. 
 Fun Arcade. The Fun Arcade is a collection of 25 fun games, though only 13 are available and currently running. It has games such as Pig Toss, Mighty Guy/Girl (depending on the gender of the player) and Planetary Pinball.
 Playground. A collection of 24 games and activities aimed at younger kids, it has significantly easier games like Helipopper and Desert Dive. It is officially known as the Mom and Kid's Playground.
 Galactic Hot Dogs

Alexa rating
On January 31, 2007, the site had an Alexa rating of 3,723.

On April 4, 2009, the site had an Alexa rating of 2,259.

On March 31, 2013, the site had an Alexa rating of 11,066 with a 16% bounce rate.

On October 14, 2017, the site had an Alexa rating of 53,934 with a 75.10% bounce rate.

On February 16, 2021, the site had an Alexa rating of 67,362 with a 51.9% bounce rate.

Safety
Funbrain is a game with no interaction with other players, limiting conversation and other adverse conditions of chatting. The site was KidSafe certified. 
CommonSense Media rates the site good for a 7 year old based on parent and child reviews.

Funbrain does have ads, both banner and sponsored limited time games for products such as Air Buddies, etc.

Awards
"Digital Dozen" from the Eisenhower National Clearinghouse for Mathematics and Science Education

References

External links
Pearsoned.com
clouduser.cn

American educational websites
Pearson plc
Education companies established in 1992
Internet properties established in 1992